Chris Connor is an album by jazz singer Chris Connor. Atlantic Records released the album, Connor's first for the label, in 1956.  The recording was Atlantic's first jazz vocal LP record.

Recording 
The tracks appearing on Chris Connor were recorded over the course of three sessions.  The first of these occurred on January 19, 1956, with a small orchestra accompanying Connor, using arrangements by Ralph Burns.  On January 23, Connor was accompanied by a quartet led by pianist John Lewis with Oscar Pettiford on bass.  On February 8, Connor's accompanists included Nick Travis, Zoot Sims and Milt Hinton, with arrangements by Burns.  The album comprises four tracks from each recording session.

Critical reception 

The Penguin Guide to Jazz includes Chris Connor in its "Core Collection", and assigns it a four-star rating (of a possible four), noting that " 'Ev'ry Time', 'It's All Right With Me', 'I Wonder What Became Of Me', and several more are unlikely to be bettered".  John Bush, writing for allmusic, calls the album one of Connor's best, giving the album a rating of four-and-a-half stars (of a possible five).

Track listing

Personnel 

On "Something to Live For", "When the Wind Was Green", "He Was Too Good to Me" and "My April Heart" (recorded January 19, 1956):
 Chris Connor – vocals
 19-piece orchestra (Ralph Burns, conductor)

On "I Get a Kick Out of You", "Where Are You?", "Everytime" and "Almost Like Being in Love" (recorded January 23, 1956):
 Chris Connor – vocals
 John Lewis – piano
 Barry Galbraith – guitar
 Oscar Pettiford – bass
 Connie Kay – drums

On "Get Out of Town", "Anything Goes", "You Make Me Feel So Young", and "Way Out There" (recorded February 8, 1956):
 Chris Connor – vocals
 Nick Travis – trumpet
 Zoot Sims – tenor saxophone; solo on "Way Out There"
 Al Young, Sam Marovitz, Ray Beckenstein, Danny Banks – saxophones
 Moe Wechsler – piano
 Barry Galbraith – guitar
 Milton Hinton – bass
 Osie Johnson – drums

References 

Chris Connor albums
Atlantic Records albums
1956 albums
Albums produced by Nesuhi Ertegun
Albums produced by Ahmet Ertegun
Albums produced by Jerry Wexler
Albums conducted by Ralph Burns